1931 saw the creation of the "Liga Argentina de Football", by 18 breakaway members of the "Asociación Argentina de Football". The LAF was the first professional league in Argentine football, it was won by Boca Juniors. The Amateur championship continued in parallel: the eventual champions were Almagro.

Liga Argentina de Football

Final standings

Top Scorers

Relegation

No teams were relegated after the inaugural season.

References

Argentina 1931 by Osvaldo José Gorgazzi at rsssf.

 
Seasons in Argentine football
, Argentine
1931 in South American football
1931 in Argentine sport